Woods is a common surname of English, Scottish and Irish origin.

People with this surname include:

A 
Aaron Woods (born 1991), Australian rugby league footballer
Al Woods (American football) (born 1987), American football player
Alan Woods (disambiguation), several people
Albert Woods (1816–1904), English officer of arms at the College of Arms in London
Albert Woods (footballer), English footballer
Albert H. Woods (1870–1951), born Aladore Herman, American theatrical producer
Alice Woods (1849–1941), British educationist
Andrew Woods (disambiguation), several people
Aubrey Woods (1928–2013), English actor
Ayiesha Woods (born 1979), contemporary Christian musician

B 
Bambi Woods (born 1955), American pornographic actress
Barbara Alyn Woods (born c. 1965), American actress
Belita Woods (1948–2012), lead singer of R&B groups, Brainstorm and Parliament-Funkadelic
Ben Woods (born 1982), rugby union footballer
Bill Woods (disambiguation), also Billy Woods, several people
Bobby Wayne Woods (1965–2009), American rapist, kidnapper and murderer
Brian Woods (disambiguation), several people

C 
Calum Woods (born 1987), English (soccer) footballer
Cary Woods, American film producer
Charles Woods (disambiguation), several people
Chevy Woods (born 1981), American rapper and songwriter
Chris Woods (disambiguation), several people
Christie Lee Woods (born 1977), American model and actress
Christine Woods (born 1983), American actress in the HBO series Hello Ladies
Clare Woods (artist) (born 1972), British artist
Clinton Woods (born 1972), British professional boxer
Clinton Edgar Woods (1863–1930), electrical, mechanical engineer and automotive engineer

D 
D. Woods (born 1985), American singer
 Danny Woods (1942–2018), American singer, member of Chairmen of the Board
Darren Woods (born 1964/1965), American businessman
Darren Keith Woods (born 1958), American opera director and operatic tenor
Dean Woods (1966–2022), Australian racing cyclist
D. J. Woods (born 1989), American gridiron player
Don Woods (American football) (born 1951), American football player
Don Woods (meteorologist) (1928–2012), American meteorologist and cartoonist
Don Woods (programmer) (born 1954), computer games programmer
Donald Woods (1933–2001), South African journalist and anti-apartheid activist
Donald Woods (actor) (1906–1998), Canadian-American film and television actor
Donald Devereux Woods (1912–1964), British microbiologist

E 
E. J. Woods (1839–1916), architect in South Australia
Earl Woods (1932–2006), US Army officer, father of Tiger Woods
Edward Woods (1903–1989), American actor
Edward Woods (engineer) (1814–1903), British civil engineer
Eliza Woods (1872–1961), American composer

F 
Frederick S. Woods (1864–1950), American mathematician
Fronza Woods, American filmmaker

G 
George Woods (disambiguation), several people
Georgie Woods (1927–2005), American radio personality
Grant Woods (1954–2021), Attorney General of Arizona 1991–1999
Granville Woods (1856–1910), African-American inventor of tram and railway equipment

H 
Harriett Woods (1927–2007), American politician and activist
Harry Woods (disambiguation), several people
Henry Woods (disambiguation), several people

I 
Ickey Woods (born 1966), American football player
Ilene Woods (1929–2010), American actress and singer, voice of Disney's Cinderella

J 
Jake Woods (born 1981), American baseball pitcher
James Woods (disambiguation), several people
Jelani Woods (born 1998), American football player
Jerome Woods (born 1973), American football player
Jessie E. Woods (1909–2001), one of the first American woman pilots
Jim Woods (1916–1988), American sportscaster
Jim Woods (baseball) (born 1939), American baseball player
Jimmy Woods (1934–2018), American jazz musician
John Woods (disambiguation), several people
Jon Woods (born 1977), American politician, record producer and musician
Joseph Woods (disambiguation), several people
Josh Woods (American football) (born 1996), American football player
JT Woods (born 2000), American football player

K 
K. Woods, West Indian cricket umpire
Kate Woods, Australian film and television director
Kate Woods (field hockey) (born 1981), South African hockey player
Kristine Woods, American sculptor and textile artist

L 
Lebbeus Woods (1940–2012), American architect and artist known unconventional designs
Leonard Woods (theologian) (1774–1854), American theologian, supporter of orthodox Calvinism
Leonard Woods (college president) (1807–1878), fourth president of Bowdoin College
Loren Woods (born 1978), American-Lebanese professional basketball player
Louis E. Woods (1895–1971), aviator with American Marine Corps

M 
Margaret Louisa Woods (née Bradley; 1855–1945), English writer, married Henry George Woods
Marjorie Curry Woods, American historian
Mark Kenneth Woods, Canadian comedy writer, actor, producer, director and TV host.
Martin Woods (born 1986), Scottish (soccer) footballer.
Mary Lee Woods (1924–2017), English mathematician and computer scientist
Mehitable E. Woods (1813–1891), hero of the American Civil War 
Michael Woods (disambiguation), also Mike Woods, several people
Mimi Woods, American voice actress known primarily for voice-overs in Japanese anime
Mitch Woods (born 1951), American boogie-woogie, jump blues and jazz pianist and singer

N 
Nan Woods (born Susan Nan Woods, 1966), American actress in the ABC television series China Beach
Ngaire Woods (born 1962/1963), New Zealand-born founding dean of the Blavatnik School of Government at University of Oxford
Nic Woods Nicholas Woods (born 1995), New Zealand field hockey player

O 
Oscar "Buddy" Woods (born c.1900-1903–1955), American Texas blues guitarist, singer and songwriter

P 
Paul Woods (disambiguation), several people
Pauline Nakamarra Woods (born 1949), Australian indigenous painter
Pete Woods, American comic book artist
Peter Woods (disambiguation), several people
Phil Woods (1931–2015), jazz saxophonist
Pinky Woods (Philip Wells Woods) (1931–2015), American jazz alto saxophonist, clarinetist, bandleader, and composer

Q 
Qyntel Woods (born 1981), American professional basketball player

R 
Randy Woods Randolph Woods (born 1970), American professional basketball player
Rashaun Woods (born 1980), American pro football player
Ray Woods (1895–1965), American college basketball standout for Illinois in the 1910s
Ray Woods (footballer) (born 1965), footballer with Tranmere Rovers, Wigan Athletic, Coventry City and Shrewsbury Town
Renn Woods (previously Ren Woods, born 1958), American film, television and stage actress, vocalist and songwriter
Robin Woods (1914–1997), English bishop
Robert Woods (disambiguation), several people
Rose Mary Woods (1917–2005), Richard Nixon's secretary from 1951 through the end of his political career
Roy Woods (born 1996), Canadian singer, rapper and songwriter

S 
Samuel Woods (disambiguation), several people
Seamus Woods, 1920s Irish Republican Army leader 
Sean Woods (born 1970), American basketball player and coach
Shelly Woods (Rochelle "Shelly" Woods) (born 1986), British wheelchair racer, competed in two Paralympic Games
Simeon Woods Richardson (born 2000), American baseball player
Simon Woods (born 1980), English actor in the British-American TV series Rome and the BBC1 series Cranford
Skip Woods (born 1970), American screenwriter, producer and film director
Sparky Woods (born 1953), American football coach
Stacey Grenrock-Woods (born 1968), American writer, actress, and correspondent on The Daily Show
Stanley Woods (1903–1993), Irish motorcycle racer in the 1920s and 1930s
Steve Woods (Stephen John Woods) (born 1976), English footballer with Chesterfield, Plymouth Argyle, Stoke City and Torquay United
Stevie Woods (musician) (1951–2014), American R&B singer
Stuart Woods (1938–2022), American novelist
Sydney Woods (1853 – after 1895), merchant and politician in Newfoundland
Sydney S. Woods Sidney Sterling Woods (1917–1989), American fighter ace of World War II
 Symere Woods (born 1994), American rapper known professionally as Lil Uzi Vert

T 
Taryn Woods (born 1975), Australian water polo player
Terry Woods (born 1947), Irish folk musician
Thomas Woods (disambiguation), several people
Tiger Woods (born 1975), American golfer
Tim Woods (George Burrell Woodin) (1934–2002), American professional wrestler
Tom Woods (disambiguation), also Tommy Woods, several people
Tony Woods (Australian rules footballer)
Tony Woods (comedian), American comedian
Tyler Woods (born 1982), American singer-songwriter
Tyrone Woods (Walter Tyrone Woods) (born 1969), professional baseball player with Nippon
Tyrone S. Woods (Tyrone Snowden Woods) (1971–2012), American CIA security officer killed in 2012 Benghazi attack

V 
Vincent Woods (born 1960), Irish poet, playwright and RTÉ Radio 1 arts show host

W 
Wendy Woods (1941–2013), South African educator and anti-apartheid activist
William Woods (disambiguation) several people

X 
Xavier Woods (born 1986), ring name of American professional wrestler Austin Watson
Xavier Woods (American football) (born 1995), American football player

Z 
Zach Woods (born 1984), American actor

Fictional characters
Alexx Woods, on CSI: Miami
Babs Woods, on the British soap opera Family Affairs
 Darren Woods, a character in the  1985 American science fantasy movie Explorers
Dawn Woods (also Hope), on the British ITV soap opera Emmerdale
Elle Woods, in the novel, film and Broadway adaptation Legally Blonde
Nancy Woods, in Archie Comics
Penny Gordon Woods, in the American sitcom Good Times
 Frank Woods, main supporting character in Call of Duty: Black Ops, Call of Duty: Black Ops II and Call of Duty: Black Ops Cold War
T.J. Woods, on the British ITV soap opera Emmerdale
Tanya Woods, on the British soap opera Family Affairs
Terry Woods (Emmerdale), on the British ITV soap opera Emmerdale
Whispy Woods, in Nintendo's Kirby series of video games
Willona Woods, in the American sitcom Good Times

See also
Wood (surname)

References

English-language surnames
Surnames of English origin
English toponymic surnames